"Brother" is the first single released from Australian singer Matt Corby's extended play (EP), Into the Flame. The song peaked at number 3 on the ARIA Charts as the Into the Flame EP, as songs' sales are counted towards their parent EPs on the singles chart. The song won Song of the Year at the 2012 ARIA Awards and was nominated for the same category at the 2012 APRA Awards. It also came in at #3 in the Triple J Hottest 100, 2011, behind "Somebody That I Used to Know" and "Lonely Boy".

Charts

Decade-end charts

Other versions
Thundamentals performed a version of "Brother" on triple j's Like a Version in 2012.

Austin P. McKenzie performed a version of "Brother" on August 30, 2015, live at the Spring Awakening Cabaret.

References

2011 singles
2011 songs
Matt Corby songs
ARIA Award-winning songs